The Ministry of Disaster Management is a Ministry of the Government of Maharashtra. 
state.

The Ministry is headed by a cabinet level Minister. Eknath Shinde is Current Chief Minister of Maharashtra and Minister of Disaster Management Government of Maharashtra.

Head office

List of Cabinet Ministers

List of Ministers of State

References 

Government of Maharashtra
Government ministries of Maharashtra